Time Before and Time After is a jazz studio album by French jazz violinist Dominique Pifarély. This album was released in the label ECM Records in August 2015.

Composition
The album's name Time Before and Time After is from the T. S. Eliot's poem "Burnt Norton" and the tracklist is also an evocation of the work of many poets like Mahmoud Darwish, Fernando Pessoa, André du Bouchet, Henri Michaux, Paul Celan, Juan Gelman, and Bernard Noël.

Track listing
ECM Records – ECM 2411.

Personnel
Dominique Pifarély – violin

References

ECM Records albums
2015 albums
Albums produced by Manfred Eicher